Kildinstroy is an urban locality (an urban-type settlement) in Kolsky District of Murmansk Oblast, Russia, located on the Kola Peninsula on the lower Kola River,  south of Murmansk. Population:  2,861 (2002 Census); 3,731 (1989 Census).

It was founded around 1935. By the All-Russian Central Executive Committee (VTsIK) Resolution of October 1937, it was granted the work settlement status.

References

Notes

Sources

Urban-type settlements in Murmansk Oblast
Kolsky District